"Do It" is a song by American R&B duo Chloe x Halle, released on May 14, 2020, as the second single from their second studio album Ungodly Hour (2020). It was written by Chloe, Halle, and Victoria Monét, as well as Vincent van den Ende and Scott Storch, who handled the production. An accompanying music video directed by C Prinz and produced by tara sheree was released on May 15, 2020. In the video, the sisters perform coordinated choreography while wearing a number of glittering outfits. The duo also created a dance challenge for the song on the popular video sharing app TikTok in 2020. A remix of the song with Doja Cat featuring City Girls and Mulatto was released on September 4, 2020.

"Do It" became the duo's first song to achieve major chart success in the US, becoming their first entry on the Billboard Hot 100, where it peaked at number 63. Pitchfork ranked the song at number 15 on their list of the 100 Best Songs of 2020. At the 2021 ceremony, the song received a Grammy Award nomination for Best R&B Song.

Background and composition 
"Do It" was written by Chloe and Halle Bailey, Victoria Monét, Scott Storch, Avedon and Anton Kuehl-Joergensen. The song was produced by Storch, with co-production by Avedon and Asoteric. The song's main concept is about getting dressed up and partying with your friends. According to the duo, "Do It" is meant to send a positive and uplifting message amid the current circumstances of the world. "During this time, music brings a lot of healing," Chloe x Halle said, per a press release. They further elaborated: "We hope this song inspires someone to get up and dance, shake all the stress and anxiety away, and to 'Do It' as the song says. We felt so good writing a song that will make people wanna bop to it and lift their spirits."
 
"Do It" is a song set in common time with an energy-filled tempo of 83 beats per minute. The song is written in the key of F minor. A preview video of the duo singing the chorus of "Do It" was uploaded via TikTok on May 12, 2020.

Critical reception 
"Do It" received acclaim from music critics. Ebone Chatman of Black Hollywood Live called it "the perfect summer anthem". Deep Shah of Color X Studios praised the duo's musical sound and smooth R&B style, saying that the song serves as "another sublime slice of the pair's sultry and silky smooth R&B". In his review for Entertainment Weekly, Eli Enis declared the song as the duo's "most danceable track yet", and said it is "something you can stripper-kick around the house to while still enjoying their uniquely complex harmonies." HotNewHipHop labeled the song as having a "smooth, easy-going nature". Mike Wass of Idolator described the song as a "party jam" and a "feel-good bop". Uproxxs Carolyn Droke wrote: "The duo's mesmerizing harmonization melts over a fluttering backbeat". Droke highlighted the lyrics "I beat my face / Moving fast 'cause the Uber on the way / Taking pictures make sure you can't see no lace", which the duo "croon at the single's hook".

Music video

A music video for "Do It" was released on May 15, 2020, a day after the song's release. It was directed by C Prinz, while production was handled by Freenjoy Productions and choreography was handled by Kendra Bracy and Ashanti Ledo. Andrew Makadsi served as the video's creative director.

Accolades

Live performances 
Chloe x Halle first performed "Do It" at the Dear Class of 2020 virtual commencement event on June 6, 2020, which premiered via YouTube. The performance was broadcast from their backyard with both of them wearing custom cage dresses designed by Zana Bayne, created with stylist Zerina Akers, in white leather paired with latex undergarments, by Venus Prototype. On June 16, 2020, Chloe x Halle performed the song on The Today Show. On June 28, 2020, they performed the song at the BET Awards 2020. On August 3, 2020, they performed the song during the 31st GLAAD Media Awards with drag queens Mayhem Miller, Naomi Smalls, and Vanessa Vanjie Mateo. "Do It" was also performed during the duo's NPR Tiny Desk Concert, released on December 8, 2020, and during NBC's New Year's Eve 2021 special on December 31, 2020.

Chart performance

The song peaked at number 3 on the R&B Digital Song Sales chart, making it their first top five hit on that chart.

Charts

Weekly charts

Year-end charts

Certifications

Remix

At midnight on September 4, 2020, a remix of "Do It" featuring American singer and rapper Doja Cat, American rap duo City Girls and American rapper Latto was released with no official prior announcement. However, its imminent release was hinted at by the collaborators over social media within hours before its release.

Composition and lyrics
The "Do It" remix includes new verses from all members on the track, with Clash referring to the song as being "torn to pieces and re-assembled by Doja Cat, City Girls and Mulatto." The artists are included in the intro of the song, using their taglines, such as City Girls' "Period" and Latto's nickname-turned tag "Big Latto". Doja Cat starts the song with her verse after leading the intro and the song transitions into Chloe's first verse from the original song. The song goes into the pre-chorus with added ad-libs from Doja Cat and original chorus before both City Girls take turns rapping their verses. After the second chorus, Latto proceeds to rap her verse which leads into the final chorus and new additional verses from both Chloe and Halle.

Critical reception
The remix was mostly met with positive reception, however Yung Miami (of City Girls) received backlash from fans online for her verse, which Chris Murphy of Vulture described as "less than her best effort". Yung Miami responded with humour to the criticism, tweeting, "That's wrong y'all said I ruined the song", and telling fans, "Maybe it'll grow on y'all". Jason Lipshutz of Billboard listed the song as among the most essential releases of the week, describing the remix as one that "unites six rising stars", and that it "will be a quietly important moment". He praised "Doja Cat's raucous energy, City Girls' melodic flow and Latto's confident drawl", while reminding readers to not "overlook the classy vibe Chloe x Halle carried over from the original".

Charts

Release history

References 

2020 songs
2020 singles
Chloe x Halle songs
Songs written by Chloe Bailey
Songs written by Halle Bailey
Songs written by Scott Storch
Songs written by Victoria Monét
Columbia Records singles
Songs written by Latto
Doja Cat songs
City Girls songs
Latto songs
Songs written by Doja Cat